Peptidase inhibitor 15 is a protein that in humans is encoded by the PI15 gene.

Function

This gene encodes a trypsin inhibitor. The protein shares similarity to insect venom allergens, mammalian testis-specific proteins and plant pathogenesis-related proteins. It is frequently expressed in human neuroblastoma and glioblastoma cell lines, and thus may play a role in the central nervous system. [provided by RefSeq, Jul 2008].

References

Further reading